Daniel John Mullen (born 26 October 1989) is an Australian soccer player who last played for Wellington Phoenix. He played as a centre back and a right back. Daniel is the cousin of Matthew Mullen and son of Joe Mullen, a former Socceroo.

Club career

Adelaide United
 
Mullen joined United for the 2008–09 A-League season. On 26 July 2008 he made his debut for Adelaide United in a 0–0 against Newcastle Jets in the Pre-Season Cup. He has since gone on to win a place in the team in the league and also featured against Kashima Antlers in the AFC Champions League. He played in Adelaide's Champions league semi final's 1st leg 3–0 victory over Uzbekistan outfit Bunyodkor and was surely the best game in his short career.

In November 2008 Daniel signed a new two-year deal with Adelaide keeping him at the club until the end of the 2010–11 season. Mullen began to hold down a regular starting spot at right back for Adelaide including starting the inaugural FIFA Club World Cup game for the South Australian team in which he scored the equalising goal against Waitakere United. Mullen scored his first league goal for Adelaide with a powerful header in the 3–2 victory over North Queensland Fury in Townsville in Round 4. He had some trouble holding a spot the first team squad with Robert Cornthwaite and Iain Fyfe regularly used at centre back.

Dalian Aerbin
In July 2012 Mullen signed a two-year deal with Dalian Aerbin in the Chinese Super League.

Melbourne Victory
Daniel Mullen Joined Melbourne Victory on loan for the second half of the 2012–13 season.

Western Sydney Wanderers
On 3 February 2014 he signed, along with Golgol Mebrahtu, with Western Sydney Wanderers. However, since there were no spaces remaining in the club's A-League squad, Mullen was only eligible to participate in Western Sydney Wanderers' 2014 AFC Champions League campaign during the 2013–14 season. On 18 March 2014, following a long-term injury to Golgol Mebrahtu, Mullen was added to Western Sydney Wanderers' A-League squad. Mullen parted ways with the Wanderers on 30 January 2015.

Newcastle Jets
On 31 January 2015, Mullen joined Newcastle Jets. On 10 May 2017, he was released by Newcastle Jets, along with another seven off-contract players.

Wellington Phoenix
On 9 August 2017, Mullen joined Wellington Phoenix on a one-year deal.

International career
Mullen debuted for the Australian national team in a qualifying match for the 2011 AFC Asian Cup against Kuwait in March 2009.

In 2021, he fully retired his soccer career to teach Physical Education at St Peter's College, Adelaide, Australia

Honours 
Western Sydney Wanderers 
 AFC Champions League: 2014

References

External links
 Adelaide United profile 
 FFA – Young Socceroos profile 

1989 births
Australian soccer players
Australian people of Irish descent
Australia international soccer players
A-League Men players
Chinese Super League players
Adelaide United FC players
Dalian Professional F.C. players
Melbourne Victory FC players
Western Sydney Wanderers FC players
Newcastle Jets FC players
Wellington Phoenix FC players
Campbelltown City SC players
Australian Institute of Sport soccer players
Expatriate footballers in China
Soccer players from Adelaide
Living people
Association football defenders
Para Hills Knights players
Australian expatriate soccer players
Expatriate association footballers in New Zealand
People educated at Marcellin College, Bulleen